Caíque da Silva Maria (born 14 June 1998), known as just Caíque, is a Brazilian professional footballer who plays as a midfielder for São Paulo.

Club career
Born in Campinas, Caíque joined the youth academy of São Paulo FC in 2007. In 2016, he won the Copa do Brasil and Campeonato Paulista under 20 with the side. On 30 December 2017, Caíque was promoted by manager Dorival Júnior to the senior squad.

On 20 January 2018, Caíque made his first team debut against Grêmio Esportivo Novorizontino in the Paulista competition, where he failed to score from the penalty spot. In 2020 he joined Botafogo FC on a free transfer.

References

External links

1998 births
Living people
Association football forwards
Brazilian footballers
São Paulo FC players
Brazil youth international footballers
Sportspeople from Campinas